Andrew C Hayward, MBBS, BSc, MSc, DTMH, MD, FPHM, (born April 1966) is professor of infectious disease epidemiology and inclusion health research and Director of the Institute of Epidemiology and Healthcare at University College London.

Research 
Hayward was one of the founders of Flu Watch in 2006, designed to understand transmission of influenza in the general community. As well as continuing surveillance it has provided data for modelling flu epidemiology. Previously, models were based data from the USA between 1948 and 1981 that was collected in very different social, travel and community settings. Participant households in England were invited to join after being selected at random from the lists of volunteer general practitioners.

His research includes developing health intervention methods for people experiencing homelessness, drug users and people in prisons.

He is a member of the UK SAGE sub committee - New and Emerging Respiratory Virus Threats Advisory Group - which has played a key role in advising the UK government during the COVID-19 Pandemic.

Awards 
In 2017 he was awarded the UCL Student Choice Award for Outstanding Post Graduate Research Supervision. In 2019 he was appointed Senior Investigator at the National Institute for Health and Care Research (NIHR).

He has a H-index of 57 on Google scholar.

References

External links 

Living people
Academics of University College London
Fellows of the Royal Society of Biology
British epidemiologists
NIHR Senior Investigators
20th-century British medical doctors
21st-century British medical doctors
1966 births